Naseeb Singh is an Indian politician and is member of the Second, Third  and Fourth Legislative Assembly of Delhi. He is a member of the Indian National Congress and represented the Vishwas Nagar (Assembly constituency) of Delhi from 1998 to 2013.

References

Indian National Congress politicians from Delhi
Living people
Delhi MLAs 1998–2003
Delhi MLAs 2003–2008
Delhi MLAs 2008–2013
1967 births